R. Chokkar is an Indian politician and was a Member of the Legislative Assembly. He was elected to the Tamil Nadu legislative assembly as an Indian National Congress (INC) candidate from Virudhunagar constituency in the 1989 election and as a Tamil Maanila Congress (Moopanar) (TMC) candidate from Sivakasi constituency in 1996.

Chokkar resigned from his seat in the Assembly on 1 June 2000. His son, Sreeraja Chokkar, was nominated as the INC candidate to contest the Sivakasi seat in the 2016 state assembly elections.

References 

Indian National Congress politicians from Tamil Nadu
Living people
Tamil Maanila Congress politicians
Tamil Nadu MLAs 1996–2001
Year of birth missing (living people)